Patryk Rajkowski (born 22 February 1996) is a Polish track cyclist, who competes in sprinting events. He has qualified to compete in the sprint and team sprint events at the 2020 Summer Olympics. He also competed in the keirin at the 2018 UCI Track Cycling World Championships.

Major results

2013
 3rd  Team sprint, European Junior Track Championships
2014
 European Junior Track Championships
1st  Keirin
2nd  Team sprint
3rd  Sprint
 2nd  Team sprint, European Under-23 Track Championships
 UCI Junior Track World Championships
3rd  Keirin
3rd  Team sprint
2015
 National Under-23 Track Championships
1st Sprint
1st Kilometer
 2nd  Team sprint, European Under-23 Track Championships
2017
 3rd  Team sprint, European Under-23 Track Championships
2018
 2018–19 UCI World Cup
3rd Team sprint, Hong Kong
2019
 2019–20 UCI World Cup
2nd Team sprint, Cambridge
2nd Team sprint, Brisbane
2020
 1st  Kilometer, National Track Championships

References

External links

1996 births
Living people
Polish male cyclists
Polish track cyclists
People from Kórnik
European Games competitors for Poland
Cyclists at the 2019 European Games
Cyclists at the 2020 Summer Olympics
Olympic cyclists of Poland
21st-century Polish people